William David Swaggerty (born December 5, 1956) is a former Major League Baseball pitcher who played for the Baltimore Orioles from 1983 to 1986.

Career
A native of Sanford, Florida, Swaggerty attended Stetson College, and played collegiate summer baseball in 1978 with the Wareham Gatemen of the Cape Cod Baseball League.

Swaggerty made his Major League debut on August 13, 1983 for the World Series champion Baltimore Orioles. He went on to appear in 32 games for the Orioles between 1983 and 1986, making 8 starts.

After two years in the Kansas City Royals' farm system, Swaggerty retired after the 1988 season.

References

External links

1956 births
Living people
Major League Baseball pitchers
Baltimore Orioles players
Stetson Hatters baseball players
St. Johns River State Vikings baseball players
Wareham Gatemen players
Baseball players from Florida
Sportspeople from Sanford, Florida
Bluefield Orioles players
Charlotte O's players
Miami Orioles players
Omaha Royals players
Rochester Red Wings players